, formerly Nagoya Rainbow Hall, is an indoor sports arena located in Nagoya, Japan. From April 1, 2007, its name was changed to Nippon Gaishi Hall, to reflect the sponsorship of the NGK Insulators. The capacity of the arena is 10,000 people.

The hall hosted some of the group games for the 2006 and 2010 editions of the official Women's Volleyball World Championship.

It hosted Dream 16, the mixed martial arts promotion in Japan on September 25, 2010. The card was headlined by a triple main event, as Shinya Aoki takes on Marcus Aurelio in a Lightweight non-title match, MMA legend Kazushi Sakuraba met Jason "Mayhem" Miller and Tatsuya Mizuno vs. Gegard Mousasi vied in the Dream Light-Heavyweight Grand Prix Final. The card was broadcast live by HDNet at 2AM US Eastern time.

Nippon Gaishi Arena
Nippon Gaishi Arena is another facility, and it is used as a Swimming pool. It is used as an Ice rink in winter.
Capacity: 3,500

External links

Nippon Gaishi Hall Official site
Nippon Gaishi Arena Official site (Japanese)

Basketball venues in Japan
Indoor arenas in Japan
Sports venues in Nagoya
Music venues in Japan
Boxing venues in Japan
Volleyball venues in Japan
Venues of the 2026 Asian Games
Sports venues completed in 1987
1987 establishments in Japan